Dacast Inc. (formerly known as Andolis) is a Frenchlive streaming online video platform that allows businesses to broadcast and host live and on-demand video content as well as offer free or paid programming.

Unlike consumer oriented platforms such as YouTube or Facebook Live, Dacast is business-to-business (B2B). 
Over 300,000 video producers used Dacast by the end of 2020 including TV and radio stations, event production companies, school and university networks, church and house of worship networks.

Dacast is headquartered in San Francisco with locations in London, Beijing, and Manila.

The platform was launched globally on October 26, 2010. Dacast users are located worldwide, including China as 北京维迪奥科技有限公司 (Beijing Video Technology Limited).

History
The company was founded in 2008 by French developers Stephane Roulland and Aldric Feuillebois. Initially the service was based on the multicast peer-to-peer (P2P) technology, with Dacast being the product name, propriety of Andolis LLC.

This approach was abandoned because of a significant decrease in the cost of data, removing the competitive advantage of P2P.

In preparation for its official launch in 2010, Andolis renamed itself as Dacast.

Since 2013, Streaming Media Magazine has included Dacast among the lists of the 100 companies and 50 companies that matter most in online video.
In 2018 and in 2019, Dacast received the Streaming Media Readers' Choice Award for “Small/Medium-Sized Business Video Platform”.

In March 2019, Dacast acquired vzaar, a UK based online video platform.

Services
Dacast is a self-service live video streaming solution and features an OVP video platform, video hosting, and a VOD (video on demand) platform. Its white label system allows users to control their live streams and VODs. Dacast positions itself as a cloud based SaaS solution (software as a service) with the following slogan: "Streaming as a Service".

The platform allows users to monetize their video content via an integrated paywall into the media player or via ads integration.

Technology
Dacast currently provides video and audio content distribution based on industry standard HTML5 technology.
The stream ingest is RTMP and the stream delivery is supported in HLS and HDS formats.

The H.264 and X264 video compression standards allowing streaming in high-definition video (HD) are supported.

Viewing
Videos and live streams hosted on the Dacast platform can be embedded and viewed on the broadcasters’ websites, or on Facebook and Twitter social media platforms

Dacast is available on Microsoft Windows, Mac OS & iOS, and Android. The platform can be used for both live and on-demand content.

Partnerships
Dacast uses top-tier CDNs including Limelight and Akamai, which have some of the largest networks of servers in the world.

References 

Online mass media companies of the United States
Business services companies established in 2008
Video hosting
Internet properties established in 2008
Companies based in San Francisco
2008 establishments in California